The Nowra-Bomaderry Jets are an Australian rugby league football team based in Nowra, a coastal town of the South Coast region. The club is a part of Country Rugby League and previously competed in the South Coast first grade competition since 2008 when struggling clubs Nowra Warriors and Bomaderry Swamp Rats merged at the end of the 2007 competition. The Nowra Warriors and Bomaderry Swamp Rats still field teams in junior rugby league competitions.

History

In November 2007, it was decided that the Nowra Warriors would merge with long-term rivals the Bomaderry Swamp Rats for the 2008 season. Both teams had been struggling with performance and sponsorship. Bomaderry had been out of first grade for six years prior to this decision. In the past, talks of merging had been quickly dismissed, but this time it was critical for the survival of both sides.

Name, logo and colours

2008-2010
It was announced that the newly  merged team would be called the Shoalhaven Jets and their colours would be blue, gold, and black. This is the natural result from the colours of each side, with Bomaderry formerly of blue and gold and Nowra of gold and black. Their logo is similar to that of NSWRL Premier League side Newtown Jets, with the name "Jets" inscribed over a large "S" (symbolising "Shoalhaven", in contrast to the large "N" of Newtown).

2012
After the side was able to recruit enough players and sponsors to field a team in the 2012 Group 7 Rugby League first grade competition after missing the 2011 season, the club re-branded themselves to "Nowra-Bomaderry" and established a new logo. The logo is based on the original logo, but utilises the club's colours of gold, blue and black. The year 2012 is also brandished on the logo.

2014
The Jets won the first grade competition in 2014. Led by Ben Wellington the Nowra-Bomaderry Jets completed a fairy tale finish by  beating Warilla 30-20.

2015
After three years of no fielding an Under 18's team, the Jets won the Under 18's premiership in 2015. Coached by journeyman and the Jets 1st Grade prop Mick Blattner they completed another fairy tale for the club with many of the players still only 17.

Honours

Team
 Group 7 Rugby League Premierships: 
 WLT Womans League Tag 2012
 1st Grade 2014
 Under 18's 2015
 Group 7 Rugby League Runners-Up: WLT Womans League Tag 2011 & 2013
 
 CRL Clayton Cup: None

Individual
 Group 7 Rugby League Kevin Walsh Memorial Trophy (Leading Point-scorer): 1
 Leigh Ardler (2008)
 Group 7 Rugby League Tim Jones Memorial Trophy (Leading Try-scorer): 1
 Leigh Ardler (2008)
 Group 7 Rugby League Michael Cronin Medal (Best & Fairest)
 Samuel Stewart (2012)
 Group 7 Rugby League Roy Stewart Trophy (Rookie of the Year): 1
 Ryan James (2014)

Coaches
 1ST GRADE:
2008 -
2009 -
2010 - 
2011 - N/A
2012 - Chris Quinlan
2013 - Nathan Deaves
2014 - Ben Wellington
2015 - Ben Wellington
2016 - Ben Wellington

 RES GRADE
2008 -
2009 -
2010 - 
2011 -
2012 - 
2013 - Warren Goodsall
2014 - Warren Goodsall
2015 - Warren Goodsall
2016 - James Wellington

 3RD GRADE
2008 -
2009 -
2010 -
2011 -
2012 -
2013 -
2014 -
2015 - Peter Atfield
2016 - Peter Atfield

 U18'S
2008 -
2009 - 
2010 -
2011 - Warren Goodsall
2012 - N/A
2013 - N/A
2014 - N/A
2015 - Mick Blattner
2016 - Ryan James & Steven Brandon

 WLT
2011 - Scott Chittleborough
2012 - Scott Chittleborough
2013 - Scott Chittleborough
2014 - Scott Chittleborough
2015 - Belinda Holt
2016 - Talia Atfield

Captains
 1ST GRADE
2008 -
2009 -
2010 - 
2011 - N/A
2012 - Sam Stewart
2013 - Ben Wellington
2014 - Ben Wellington
2015 - Ben Wellington
2016 - Ben Wellington

 RES GRADE
2008 -
2009 -
2010 - 
2011 -
2012 - 
2013 - Gerald Browne
2014 - Gerald Browne
2015 - Gerald Browne
2016 -

 3RD GRADE
2008 -
2009 -
2010 -
2011 -
2012 -
2013 -
2014 -
2015 - 
2016 -

 U18'S
2008 -
2009 - 
2010 -
2011 - 
2012 - N/A
2013 - N/A
2014 - N/A
2015 - 
2016 -

 WLT
2011 - Belinda Chittleborough
2012 - Belinda Chittleborough
2013 - Belinda Chittleborough
2014 - Belinda Chittleborough
2015 - Talia Atfield
2016 - Talia Atfield

References

External links
 Country Rugby League homepage
 South Coast Rugby League homepage

Rugby league teams in New South Wales
Rugby league teams in Wollongong
Rugby clubs established in 2007
2007 establishments in Australia
Nowra, New South Wales